Catello Cimmino (born December 12, 1965 in Castellammare di Stabia) is a retired Italian professional football player.

He played for 4 seasons (26 games, no goals) in the Serie A for A.C. Milan, Ascoli Calcio 1898 and Calcio Como.

Honours
 Coppa Italia Primavera winner: 1984/85.
 Mitropa Cup winner: 1986/87.

References

1965 births
Living people
Italian footballers
Serie A players
Serie B players
A.C. Milan players
Ascoli Calcio 1898 F.C. players
Como 1907 players
U.S. Avellino 1912 players
Association football defenders
S.S. Ischia Isolaverde players